Wardey are a Somali  clan found in southern Somalia (Lower Jubba) and eastern Kenya, mostly along the Tana River.

The Wardey are a pastoralist community. Mostly they live in Tana River County alongside Orma communities. The tribe has a population of about 700,000 people (2022) in Kenya. They speak the Somali language and practice Islam.

the Wardey live in the respective cities of qooqani,garseni 
Afmadow,kismayo,dhobley,Bangal. The Wardey once ruled the great Sultanate of Wamo.

Notable people
 Nassir Nuh Abdi
 Boqor Waamo was a ancient somali king who used to rule Jubaland
 Fadumo Dayib

References

Somali clans